Cytec Industries Incorporated, based in Woodland Park, New Jersey was a speciality chemicals and materials technology company with pro-forma sales in 2004, including the Surface Specialties acquisition, of approximately $3.0 billion. Cytec is a result of its spin-off from American Cyanamid Company.  It makes resins, plastics, and composite materials, especially for the aerospace industry and other users of specialty materials. It was listed in NYSE with stock symbol "CYT".

Cytec currently has about 3,600 employees in Europe, North and South America, Asia and Australia.

In December 2013, Cytec Industries has entered into a tactical partnership with Mubadala Development Company.

In July 2015, Solvay announced its intent to acquire Cytec for a purchase price of US$5.5 billion. In November 2015, Cytec Industries has obtain a shareholder's stake in Penso Holdings. In December 2015, Solvay successfully completed its acquisition of Cytec. Financing consists of the issuance of around €4.7 billion senior and hybrid bonds and the ongoing €1.5 billion right issue.

References

External links
 
 

Companies formerly listed on the New York Stock Exchange
Chemical companies of the United States
Companies based in Passaic County, New Jersey
Woodland Park, New Jersey
Companies based in Stamford, Connecticut
2015 mergers and acquisitions
American subsidiaries of foreign companies
Corporate spin-offs